Eton Alive is the tenth studio album by British post-punk duo Sleaford Mods. It was released on 22 February 2019 through Extreme Eating Records.

Critical reception

At Metacritic, which assigns a weighted average score out of 100 to reviews from mainstream critics, the album received an average score of 84, based on 16 reviews, indicating "universal acclaim".

Accolades

Track listing

Charts

References

External links
 

2019 albums
Sleaford Mods albums